Zatrephes dithyris is a moth in the family Erebidae. It was described by George Hampson in 1905. It is found in French Guiana and Ecuador.

References

Phaegopterina
Moths described in 1905